Gordon Bradley (20 May 1925 – 2006) was an English footballer who played in the Football League for Leicester City and Notts County.

External links
 

English footballers
English Football League players
1925 births
2006 deaths
Scunthorpe United F.C. players
Leicester City F.C. players
Notts County F.C. players
Cambridge City F.C. players
Association football goalkeepers
FA Cup Final players